Cova-Paul-Ribeira da Torre Natural Park, in the east of the island of Santo Antão, is one of ten "natural parks" in the country of Cape Verde. Since 2016, the natural park is on the tentative list of World Heritage Sites.

Geography

The natural park covers the Cova Crater, the upper valley of the Ribeira da Torre (from Xoxo upstream), the upper valley of the Ribeira do Paul and the Pico da Cruz. The landscape is characterised by the volcanic crater of Cova, the steep cliffs and escarpments that end in the deep river valleys. Its elevation ranges from around 400 m near Xoxo to 1585 m at the Pico da Cruz.

Flora and fauna
The land cover in the natural park is part forest and part farmland. It has a large variety of endemic plants, many of which are critically endangered, endangered or vulnerable species, including Carex antoniensis, Conyza pannosa, Tornabenea insularis, Euphorbia tuckeyana and Globularia amygdalifolia. The park is the habitat of several endemic species of reptiles and birds.

See also
List of protected areas in Cape Verde

References 

 
National parks of Cape Verde
Geography of Santo Antão, Cape Verde
Paul, Cape Verde
Porto Novo Municipality
Ribeira Grande Municipality